The 1999 Croatian Bol Ladies Open doubles was the doubles event of the sixth edition of the Croatian Bol Ladies Open, a WTA Tier IV tournament and the most prestigious women's tennis tournament held in Croatia. Laura Montalvo and Paola Suárez were the defending champions, Montalvo having won the last three doubles competitions in Bol, but neither competed this year.

Home player Jelena Kostanić teamed up with Czech Michaela Paštiková to win the tournament, defeating Meghann Shaughnessy and Andreea Vanc, 7–5, 6–7(1–7), 6–2.

Seeds

Draw

External links
 1999 Croatian Bol Ladies Open Draw

Croatian Bol Ladies Open
Croatian Bol Ladies Open